The 2009 CONCACAF U-17 Championship qualification tournaments took place in 2008 to qualify national teams for the 2009 CONCACAF U-17 Championship, which was played in Mexico from 21 April to 9 May 2009.

Central American Zone

Group A 
Matches in Group A were hosted by Panama's association football governing body, FEPAFUT, the Federación Panameña de Fútbol. All matches took place at Estadio Virgilio Tejeira in the city of Penonomé.

Group B 
Matches in Group B were hosted by El Salvador's association football governing body, Federación Salvadoreña de Fútbol. All matches too place in the Estadio Cuscatlán in the city of San Salvador.

Playoff 
The runner-up from each Central American group played a two-legged playoff to determine the 8th and final team to qualify for the tournament proper. Guatemala won the two-legged playoff 2:1 on aggregate score.

Caribbean Zone
Caribbean qualifying was determined in the 2008 CFU Youth Cup. Cuba qualified with Trinidad and Tobago by reaching the final.

References 

Qual
2009